Joeri Pardo (born 12 October 1977) is a retired Belgian football midfielder. He was a squad member for the 1997 FIFA World Youth Championship.

References

1977 births
Living people
Belgian footballers
Club Brugge KV players
Cercle Brugge K.S.V. players
S.C. Eendracht Aalst players
R.F.C. Tournai players
K.M.S.K. Deinze players
Association football midfielders
Belgium youth international footballers
Belgian Pro League players